The Swords Project is the first release from the band The Swords Project (now simply named Swords).

Track listing
 Shannon's Wedding Song  – 9:35
 The New Assassin  – 5:01
 Squatting Level  – 6:35
 Case Study In Pathetics  – 5:38

References 

Swords (band) albums
2001 debut EPs